Sakhdar is a village in Zeberkhan Rural District, Zeberkhan District, Nishapur County, Razavi Khorasan Province, Iran. At the 2006 census, its population was 381, in 117 families. Sakhdar is located on the foot of Mount Binalud.

References 

Populated places in Nishapur County